The Edinburgh Worldwide Investment Trust is a publicly traded investment trust listed on the London Stock Exchange. The Trust, also known as EWIT, invests in global stock markets. The Trust is managed by Baillie Gifford & Co Limited, the Edinburgh based investment management partnership. It is a constituent of the FTSE 250 Index.

History
Edinburgh Worldwide started trading on 9 July 1998 and is the successor investment trust launched following the reconstruction of Dunedin Worldwide Investment Trust.

In turn Dunedin Worldwide was formed in 1990 and was the successor vehicle for the Northern American Trust, one of the earlier Scottish investment trusts established in 1896 to take advantage of investment opportunities in the rapidly changing American economy at the turn of the century. Northern American merged with Camperdown Trust in 1937 and came under the management of Dunedin Fund Managers when it was formed in 1984.

Baillie Gifford & Co Limited was appointed as investment manager and secretaries to Edinburgh Worldwide with effect from 1 November 2003. While the objective of aiming for capital growth by investing in stockmarkets throughout the world remained unchanged, the portfolio was reorganised.

References

External links
Edinburgh Worldwide Investment Trust Website
Baillie Gifford & Co Website
Trust Magazine - Investment trust news, expert analysis, videos, competitions, and more from Baillie Gifford

Investment trusts of the United Kingdom
Financial services companies established in 1998
Companies listed on the London Stock Exchange
Investment management companies of the United Kingdom
Companies based in Edinburgh
1998 establishments in Scotland